This is a list of urban tramway systems in Romania. It includes all tram systems, past and present. Cities with currently operating systems, and those systems themselves, are indicated in bold and blue background colored rows. The use of the diamond (♦) symbol indicates where there were (or are) two or more independent tram systems operating concurrently within a single metropolitan area.  Those tram systems that operated on other than standard gauge track (where known) are indicated in the 'Notes' column.

See also
Transport in Romania
List of town tramway systems in Europe
List of tram and light rail transit systems
List of metro systems
List of trolleybus systems

References

Romania
Tramways